Council elections for the Borough of Chorley were held on 3 May 2018 as part of the 2018 United Kingdom local elections.

All locally registered electors (British, Irish, Commonwealth and European Union citizens) who are aged 18 or over on polling day were entitled to vote in the local elections.

The result was a hold for the ruling Labour group.

Results summary

The results of the 2018 elections are summarised below.

Ward results

Adlington & Anderton

Astley & Buckshaw

Chisnall

Chorley East

Chorley North East

Chorley North West

Chorley South East

Chorley South West

Clayton-le-Woods & Whittle-le-woods

Clayton-le-Woods North

Clayton-le-Woods West & Cuerden

Coppull

Eccleston & Mawdesley

Euxton North

Euxton South

Pennine

Wheelton and Whitnell

References

Chorley
Chorley Borough Council elections
2010s in Lancashire